Peggy Sundelle Charren (née Walzer; March 9, 1928 – January 22, 2015) was an American activist, known as the founder of Action for Children's Television (ACT), a national child advocacy organization, in 1968. The organization was founded in an effort to encourage program diversity and eliminate commercial abuses in children's television programming. In 1995, she was awarded the Presidential Medal of Freedom.

Early life and education
Charren was born Peggy Walzer to a Jewish family on March 9, 1928, the daughter of Ruth (née Rosenthal) and Maxwell Walzer. Her grandparents were immigrants from Russia. In 1949, Charren graduated from Connecticut College and then took a job as director of the film department at station WPIX-TV in New York City. She then served as director of the Creative Arts Council of Newton, Massachusetts and founded a company that organized children’s book fairs, Quality Book Fair; and owned and operated a gallery specializing in graphic art, Art Prints.

Career 
In 1968, concerned over the poor selection of children’s educational programming and child-targeted commercials, in 1968 she founded Action for Children’s Television (ACT), a nonprofit organization dedicated to increasing quality diversity in television choices for children. As the Communications Act of 1934 required that television stations were required to serve the public interest in exchange for using broadcast spectrum, she lobbied and pressured the industry to promote educational television programs.  In 1990, the U.S. Congress passed the Children's Television Act which required that every television station provide educational programming for children. Though she continued to work on the issue, Charren disbanded ACT in 1992, announcing that it had met the objectives she had set out to accomplish. In 1996, the rules were further tightened to require three hours of children's programming per week.

Although denounced as an advocate for censorship by her critics, including animation writers Steve Gerber and Mark Evanier, Charren has insisted she is an outspoken critic of censorship, and has cited her stance against the American Family Association's campaigns to ban various programs. She sat on the Board of Trustees of public broadcaster WGBH in Boston, Massachusetts. In 1983, Charren became an associate of the Women's Institute for Freedom of the Press (WIFP). WIFP is an American nonprofit publishing organization. The organization works to increase communication between women and connect the public with forms of women-based media.

Awards 
In 1989, the National Academy of Television Arts and Sciences awarded her its Trustees' Award. Her work with ACT culminated in the passage of the Children's Television Act of 1990, and she received a Peabody Award in 1991. In 1995, she was awarded the Presidential Medal of Freedom.

Personal life 
In 1951, she married Stanley Charren, an engineer; they had two daughters. The couple lived in Cambridge, Massachusetts. She died on January 22, 2015. In her later years, she had vascular dementia.

References

Sources
The Paley Center for Media

External links

 Biography from John Vivian's "The Media of Mass Communication"
 Interview with Peggy Charren by 360KID on 360Blog, May 2008
Beyer, Janet. "Peggy Charren", Jewish Women: A Comprehensive Historical Encyclopedia

1928 births
2015 deaths
Jewish American activists
Peabody Award winners
20th-century American Jews
Hunter College High School alumni
Presidential Medal of Freedom recipients
People from Cambridge, Massachusetts
Connecticut College alumni
Activists from New York City
21st-century American Jews
Deaths from vascular dementia